List of fishing records in the state of Wisconsin. All records are fish caught by use of hook and line and are handled by the Wisconsin Department of Natural Resources. They are up to date as of May 20, 2021.

See also 
 Door Peninsula § Waters
 Kewaunee County, Wisconsin § Fishing and boating
 Lake Winnebago § Fishing
 Hadland Fishing Camp
 National Fresh Water Fishing Hall of Fame
 Manitou Camp

References 

https://dnr.wisconsin.gov/topic/Fishing/recordfish/hookline.html

Recreational fishing-related lists
Fishing records
Sports in Wisconsin